Megh may refer to
 Megh (raga), a classical Indian raga
 Meghwal, a people of northwest India and Pakistan
 Cyclone Megh, a cyclone in the Arabian sea that struck the island of Socotra in 2015
Rain. another name for rain in Gujarati and other Indian languages